Shingel (also Romanized as Shīngel, Shangel, Shangīl, and Shengīl) is a village in Kharaqan-e Sharqi Rural District, Abgarm District, Avaj County, Qazvin Province, Iran. At the 2006 census, its population was 319, in 97 families.

References 

Populated places in Avaj County